Cambroproteus is a genus of ptychopariid trilobite from the Late Cambrian of Morocco. It has a single known species, Cambroproteus lemdadensis, whose various features are shared with disparate groups of other ptychopariids, which make it difficult to place within other established ptychopariid families.

Etymology
The generic name translates as "Cambrian Proteus."  This is in reference to the situation of how its varied features stymy understanding of its placement within Ptychopariida, effectively making it a marine shapeshifter.

References

Arthropod enigmatic taxa
Cambrian trilobites
Ptychopariida
Fossils of Morocco